Tümmler (English: Dolphin) was a wolf pack of German U-boats that operated from October 1–11, 1942 in World War II. This pack was sent into the Mediterranean Sea from their French bases and all of them succeeded in getting through the Strait of Gibraltar safely.

U-boats involved

Sources
 http://uboat.net/ops/wolfpacks/1942.htm

Wolfpacks of 1942
Wolfpack Tümmler
Wolfpack Tümmler